Pavel Šimko (born February 13, 1982 in Poprad) is a triathlete from Slovakia. Šimko was the nation's first triathlete to compete at the 2008 Summer Olympics in Beijing. During the swimming leg, Šimko was kicked by one of the competitors on top of his head causing him to lose his consciousness in the water, and was rescued by boat crew. Suffered from an endured pain, Šimko sought medical attention, and did not thereby finish the swimming leg and even the entire course.

References

External links
ITU Profile

1982 births
Living people
Slovak male triathletes
Olympic triathletes of Slovakia
Triathletes at the 2008 Summer Olympics
Sportspeople from Poprad
20th-century Slovak people
21st-century Slovak people